Clough Hall is a suburb of Kidsgrove in the Borough of Newcastle-under-Lyme, North Staffordshire.

History 
The earliest trace of any buildings near Clough Hall dates back to the 1440s.

References 

Kidsgrove